Spasenie is a Belarusian Christian and pop rock band from Brest, which was created in 1989.

History 
The band was formed in August 1989, when around a guitarist, a violinist, a saxophonist (young musicians gave an impromptu concert in Brest city’s central park) spontaneously gathered about 150 people. The boys were just playing music, and suddenly, after the ending of one of songs, they heard applause behind themselves. Touched, the players realized that there is a need to come together in a band.

In the same year, they started to rehearse, wrote first songs and, a few months later, were invited to tour across Yakutia.

To its 17th anniversary, the band gave a big concert with the orchestra at the Palace of the Republic, which recording was released on the DVD "17 Live" in 2006.

A feature of the band is that music is written by not one but all members.

The band has been very often toured abroad: with performances, musicians attended the Baltic countries, Ukraine, Romania, Poland, Germany, Canada, Russia, the US, the UK, South Korea, South Africa, and more regions.

On August 3, 2019, the band celebrated the 30th anniversary with a major concert with the orchestra at Lenin Square in Brest.

Name 
Band members chose the name "Spasenie" – indicating that they see music as salvation  – while on a train to Yakutia in the early 1990s.

The language question 
For the first 15 years of its existence, the band sang exclusively in Russian, but with the release of the album Crossing the Jordan, the English language became heard much more frequently in its songs. Vocalist Igor Mukha answered Volha Samusik from Muzykalnaya Gazeta on the language question this way, "We live in Brest. This is actually the border. Its peculiar feature is the mixture of languages. There are a lot of words from Ukrainian, Polish... There was never neither the clean Belarusian nor the Russian language. Therefore, we sang not in the native but in the Russian language. Although I recognize the indisputable melodicism of Belarusian, English is also very musically flexible. If we compare it with Russian, then to sing in the last one is harder because of all these combinations of letters "br," “str," etc. So it was not difficult to switch for us."

Social activity 
Every year the band holds the rock music festival-competition "X-Star" (since 2005) and organizes an annual large youth concert in Brest called the "" (since 2009). The participants also oppose abortion.

In 2019 the band together with National Academy of Sciences of Belarus prepared and launched a guided tour "Brest is the city of the Bible."

Discography

Albums 
 Хабаровский край (1992)
 Возвращение домой (musical) (1992)
 Старые песни (1992)
 Мой Бог скала (1993)
 Только Ты (1995)
 Человек без зубила (1997)
 Бьют часы (1998)
 Exit (1999)
 Летит безжалостное время (2000)
 ... а Солнце за кормой (2001)
 Еврейский альбом (2001)
 Без слов о том же (feat. Igor Rudy) (2003)
 Кардиограмма (2003)
 Crossing the Jordan (feat. Tim Spransy and Becky Sharp) (2004)
 Acoustic (2007)
 Spasenie (2009)
 Reboot (feat. Brian Montrey) (2011)
 Вечные слова (2012)

Compilation albums 
 10 лет, The Best (1999)

Live DVD 

 17 Live (2007)

Participation in collections 
 Серебряный граммофон (2006) (All-National TV), (track "Плачет небо").
 Золотая 20: зима 2007 (2006) (West Records), (track "Плачет небо").

Music videos 
 Никто кроме Тебя
 Расстояние (2003)
 На метр от земли (2004)
 Плачет небо / The Word Was Spoken (2005)
 Осень
 Странные сны

Awards and nominations 
2006 – Alpha-radio Awards "".

2009 – nomination in the contest "Just Pain Folks Music Awards" for the song "... а Солнце за кормой".

2009 – nomination in the category "For Contribution to the Development of Music" at the Annual Gospel Music Association Awards.

2010 – the Radio Brest festival "": Best Band, Best Frontman (Igor Mukha).

2019 – diploma of the Brest City Council of Deputies.

Band members 

 Igor Mukha – vocals, saxophone, acoustic guitar (1989—)
 Pavel Shelpuk – vocals, violin, guitars, bass (1989—)
 Peter Semenuk – keyboards, vocals (1989—)
 Mike Choby – bass
 Dmitriy Golodko – solo guitar

Lyricist
 Alex Borisyuk – guitar (1989—)
Sound engineer
 Andrey Kovalchuk
Former members and tour musicians
Tatiana Shelpuk (vocals, keyboards), Vadim Semenuk (drums), Vitaly Kalezhinsky (drums), Yezhy Khaichuk (drums), Alex Manetskiy (drums), Dave Geer (drums), Leonid Borisevich (solo guitar), Vasily Mashliakevich (bass), Stanislav Yanchin (bass), Dmitriy Branavitsckiy, Andrey Kleshchov, Danny Platt, Brian Montrey, etc.

Literature

References

External links 
 Spasenie on Discogs

Musical groups established in 1989
Belarusian rock music groups
Christian rock groups
Pop rock groups
Soviet rock music groups